Magda Camps (born 30 September 1956) is a Spanish former swimmer who competed in the 1976 Summer Olympics.

References

1956 births
Living people
Spanish female swimmers
Spanish female butterfly swimmers
Olympic swimmers of Spain
Swimmers at the 1976 Summer Olympics
Place of birth missing (living people)